Paris 1968: Broadcast Archives is a DVD released in 2013 of a live performance recorded in 1968 for French television by American singer Diana Ross and The Supremes.

Formats
The video is available on DVD. It includes the complete performance on a French TV show by Diana Ross & The Supremes on the promotional tour of their album Reflections.

Track listing
 Medley: "Stop! In The Name Of Love"/"Come See About Me"/"My World Is Empty Without You"/"Baby Love"
 "The Lady Is A Tramp"
 "Michelle"
 "Reflections"
 "Medley Jazz"
 "Somewhere"
 "J'attendrai - Reach Out I'll Be There"

The Supremes live albums
The Supremes video albums
2013 live albums
2013 video albums